Shana O. Kelley is a scientist and University Professor at the University of Toronto's Faculty of Pharmacy and Faculty of Medicine. Her research includes the development of new technologies for clinical diagnostics and drug delivery. She will join the Departments of Chemistry and of Biomedical Engineering at Northwestern University, and will be affiliated with the International Institute for Nanotechnology at Northwestern.

Education and training
Kelley received her BS from Seton Hall University in 1994. She pursued graduate studies in chemistry at the California Institute of Technology, where she worked with Jacqueline Barton. She graduated with her PhD in 1999 with a dissertation entitled Electron Transfer through the DNA Double Helix: Spectroscopic and Electrochemical Studies.

From 1999 to 2000, Kelley was a NIH Postdoctoral Fellow at the Scripps Research Institute, where she worked with Paul Schimmel.

Independent career 
Kelley began her independent research career as an Assistant Professor in the Chemistry Department at Boston College in 2000. In 2006, she was promoted directly to the rank of Full Professor and in 2007, she joined the Leslie Dan Faculty of Pharmacy at the University of Toronto.

Kelley founded a university spin-off company named GeneOhm Sciences with her graduate advisor Jacqueline Barton. GeneOhm Sciences was based on a discovery that Kelley made during her graduate studies, where she developed a method to detect mutations in DNA by modifying the DNA strands and measuring their differing conductivity. GeneOhm Sciences used Kelley's discovery to create a diagnostic test for antibiotic-resistant MRSA bacteria. GeneOhm was acquired by Becton Dickinson in early 2006.

Kelley also founded the molecular diagnostics companies Xagenic Inc.

Awards 

 2022 Guggenheim Fellowship
 2021 Fellow of the Royal Society of Canada
 2021  Order of Ontario
 2020  AFPC / Pfizer Research Career Award
 2018  Distinguished Visiting Fellow, Rowland Institute, Harvard University
 2017  ACS Inorganic Nanoscience Award
 2017  Somorjai Visiting Miller Professorship (UC Berkeley)
 2016  SLAS Innovation Award
 2016  NSERC Brockhouse Award
 2016  Fellow, American Institute for Medical and Biological Engineering
 2016  Fellow, Canadian Academy of Health Sciences
 2013  University of Toronto Distinguished Professor Award
 2011  Steacie Prize
 2011  University of Toronto Inventor of the Year
 2010  NSERC E.W.R Steacie Fellowship
 2008  Named one of Canada's Top 40 Under 40
 2005  Camille-Dreyfus Teacher-Scholar Award
 2004  MIT Technology Review TR100 Top Innovator
 2004  Alfred P. Sloan Research Fellowship
 2004  NSF CAREER Award
 2000  Dreyfus New Faculty Award
 2000  Research Innovation Award

Personal life 
Kelley is married to fellow University of Toronto Professor Ted Sargent. They met at a nanotechnology conference at UC Irvine, and have two children together.

References

External links 
Translational Biomedical Engineering Talk on September 9, 2020

Academic staff of the University of Toronto
California Institute of Technology alumni
Seton Hall University alumni
Boston College faculty
21st-century American chemists
Living people
Year of birth missing (living people)